Ånäset is a locality situated in Robertsfors Municipality, Västerbotten County, Sweden with 610 inhabitants in 2010.

References 

Populated places in Västerbotten County
Populated places in Robertsfors Municipality